Paradriopea is a genus of beetles in the family Cerambycidae, containing the following species:

 Paradriopea birmanica Breuning, 1970
 Paradriopea fruhstorferi Breuning, 1965

References

Acanthocinini